This article lists events that occurred during 1943 in Estonia.

Incumbents

Events
Bombing by Soviets.
March 24 – the ship Bungsberg was sunk.

Births

Deaths

References

 
1940s in Estonia
Estonia
Estonia
Years of the 20th century in Estonia